The Hoboken Public Library is the free public library of Hoboken, New Jersey. It is a member of the Bergen County Cooperative Library System, a consortium of municipal libraries in the northeastern New Jersey counties of Bergen, Hudson, Passaic, and Essex. The library was established through the philanthropy of Martha Bayard Stevens. The building opened in 1897. It is listed on the New Jersey Register of Historic Places and the National Register of Historic Places.

The library also operates a small branch at 124 Grand St., in the Multi-Service Community Center building housing various other municipal services.

See also

National Register of Historic Places listings in Hudson County, New Jersey
Landmarks of Hoboken, New Jersey

References

External links 
Hoboken Public Library
BCCLS

Buildings and structures in Hoboken, New Jersey
Libraries on the National Register of Historic Places in New Jersey
Library buildings completed in 1897
National Register of Historic Places in Hudson County, New Jersey
New Jersey Register of Historic Places
Public libraries in New Jersey